Hans Walzhofer (23 March 1906 - 1 March 1970) was an Austrian football forward who played for Austria in the 1934 FIFA World Cup. He also played for Jedlersdorfer SC, Floridsdorfer Athletiksport-Club, Wiener AC, and Sportclub Wacker.

References

1906 births
Austrian footballers
Austria international footballers
Association football forwards
Wiener AC players
1934 FIFA World Cup players
1970 deaths